Grevillea montis-cole, commonly known as Mount Cole grevillea, is a species of flowering plant in the family Proteaceae and is endemic to central-western Victoria, Australia. It is a shrub with divided leaves with 5 to 15 lobes, the end lobes more or less triangular to narrowly oblong and sharply-pointed, and clusters of greenish to fawn and dull purplish flowers.

Description
The edges of the leaves and leaflets are rolled under and the lower surface has a few woolly hairs. The flowers are greenish to fawn on the outsided, dull purplish inside, with a bright red style.

Taxonomy
Grevillea montis-cole was first formally described in 1983 by Raymond Vaughan Smith in the journal Muelleria from specimens he collected in the Mount Cole State Forest in 1965. In the same journal, Smith described two subspecies and the names are accepted by the Australian Plant Census:
 Grevillea montis-cole subsp. montis-cole R.V.Sm.

Evidence from preliminary genetic data combined with morphological and habitat differences indicates that Grevillea montis-cole subsp. brevistyla may require recognition as a distinct species.

Distribution and habitat
Subspecies brevistyla occurs on the upper slopes of Mount Langi Ghiran at an altitude of  among granitic outcrops.  Other plant species found in close proximity include bundy (Eucalyptus goniocalyx), shiny tea-tree (Leptospermum turbinatum), wedge-leaf hop-bush (Dodonaea viscosa subsp. cuneata), hairy correa (Correa aemula),  violet kunzea (Kunzea parvifolia) and cranberry heath (Astroloma humifusum).

Subspecies montis-cole occurs in Mount Cole State Forest.

Conservation status
Subspecies brevistyla is listed as "Vulnerable" under the Australian Government Environment Protection and Biodiversity Conservation Act 1999, "threatened" in Victoria under the Flora and Fauna Guarantee Act 1988, and as "Vulnerable in Victoria" on the Department of Sustainability and Environment's Advisory List of Rare Or Threatened Plants In Victoria.

Subspecies montis-cola is listed as "Rare in Victoria" on the Victorian Department of Sustainability and Environment's Advisory List of Rare Or Threatened Plants In Victoria''.

References

montis-cole
Flora of Victoria (Australia)
Proteales of Australia
Plants described in 1983